You Mean the World to Me (Chinese: 海墘新路; Tâi-lô: Hái-Kînn Sin-Lōo) is a 2017 Malaysian semi-autobiographical drama film directed and written by Saw Teong Hin, based on his stage play. The film, set in 1970s Penang, is the first Malaysian film that is entirely in Penang Hokkien. The film's Chinese name, 海墘新路 (Hái-Kînn Sin-Lōo), refers to a Hokkien nickname for Victoria Street in George Town, Penang.

Development
The film's script was written based on Saw's family history and his estranged relationship with his mother. After the script was finished, Saw had desires of turning it into a film but lacked enough money to do so. He presented the script to several parties who were interested in the project but they had conditioned that the film be made in Mandarin instead, to which Saw refused. Thus, he decided that the script be made into a stage play first. The play, under the name of Hai Ki Xin Lor, was held in 2014 during the George Town Festival to receptive audiences. The success of the play helped open doors for him to get funds to turn the play into a feature film.

Music
The film's theme song, "感謝妳 (Kám-siā Lí/Kám-siā Lú)" was performed by Taiwanese singer Chao Chuan.

Cast 
 Yeo Yann Yann as Hoon
 Steve Yap as Father
 Chelsia Ng as Vivian
 Neo Swee Lin as Cheng
 Frederick Lee as Sunny
 Gregg Koay as Young Sunny
 Yee Min Eng as Young Hoon
 Ai Suan Tan as Old Vivian
 John Tan as Ah Boy

Awards

References

External links 

 Official website

2017 films
Hokkien-language films
2017 biographical drama films
Films directed by Saw Teong Hin
Astro Shaw films
Films with screenplays by Saw Teong Hin
Malaysian drama films
2017 drama films